Barbara Hibner Soccer Stadium (commonly referred to as Hibner Stadium) is a college soccer stadium on the campus of the University of Nebraska–Lincoln in Lincoln, Nebraska. The 2,500-seat stadium opened in 2015 and serves as the primary home venue for Nebraska's soccer program. The complex is named for Barbara Hibner, who served as an athletic administrator at the university from 1976 to 2005.

History

Nebraska's soccer program was established in 1994, making NU the first school in the Big Eight Conference to sponsor a women's soccer varsity program. From its creation until 2014, the program played its home games at the Ed Weir Track & Soccer Stadium; before it was demolished in 2019, the stadium was located along the northeast corner of Memorial Stadium and named in honor of College Football Hall of Famer Ed Weir. The soccer field at the Weir complex, built in 1975, was among the smallest in the Big Ten and the only one without stadium lights.

In July 2013, the University of Nebraska Board of Regents approved the construction of a privately funded $20.4-million soccer and tennis complex to be located north of the Bob Devaney Sports Center, adjacent to Nebraska Innovation Campus. The tennis development was named for donors Sid and Hazel Dillon; the soccer development was named in honor of Dr. Barbara Hibner, who served as an administrator overseeing women's athletic programs at Nebraska for nearly thirty years. Hibner, who spearheaded the creation of mascot Lil' Red in 1994, received the University of Nebraska athletic department's first Trailblazer Award, an award that was renamed in her honor following her death in 2007.

Hibner Stadium broke ground in 2014 and was dedicated on September 25, 2015. The 2,500-seat venue features a sitting- or standing-room berm on the east end of the field. John Walker, the program's head coach since its inception, said of the new stadium: "This is phenomenal. Everything is first class. There's nothing cookie-cutter about it." Nebraska ranked thirteenth nationally in attendance in its first season at Hibner Stadium.

References

College soccer venues in the United States
Soccer venues in Nebraska
Sports in Lincoln, Nebraska
Sports venues in Nebraska
Buildings and structures in Lincoln, Nebraska